Siebert is a surname derived from the Germanic personal name composed of the elements sigi ‘victory’ + berht ‘bright’, ‘famous’.

The name may refer to:
Al Siebert (1934–2009), American author and researcher in psychological resilience
Allan Siebert (born 1942), American bridge player
Babe Siebert (1904–1939), Canadian professional ice hockey player
Bernd Siebert (politician) (born 1949), German politician
Charles Siebert (1938–2022), American actor and television director
Christoph Siebert, German choral conductor
Daniel Lee Siebert (1954–2008), American serial killer
Daniel Siebert (ethnobotanist) (contemporary), American ethnobotanist, pharmacognosist, and author
Daniel Siebert (referee) (contemporary), German football referee
Detlef Siebert (contemporary), British television writer and director
Dick Siebert (1912–1978), American professional baseball player
Gloria Siebert (born 1964), German Olympic hurdler
Günter Siebert (footballer) (1930–2017), German footballer
Günter Siebert (weightlifter) (born 1931), German weightlifter
Hannes Siebert (born 1961), South African diplomat
Klaus Siebert (1955–2016), German Olympic biathlete
Ludwig Siebert (disambiguation), multiple people
Muriel Siebert (1928–2013), American businesswoman; first woman to hold a seat on the New York Stock Exchange
Neville Siebert, New Zealand international football (soccer) player
Sonny Siebert (born 1937), American professional baseball player
Thomas L. Siebert (born 1946), American lawyer and diplomat; ambassador to Sweden 1994–97

Fictional characters
President Siebert

See also
Seibert
Seifert
Sibert (disambiguation)
Seiber
Sieber (disambiguation)
Ziebart
Zibrt
Duke Zeibert (1910–1997), proprietor of a Washington DC restaurant
Žibert

References

German-language surnames
Surnames from given names